Fort Island Gulf Beach is a beach in Citrus County, Florida, United States.

Beaches of Florida
Beaches of Citrus County, Florida